Ramsgill is a small village in Nidderdale, North Yorkshire, England, about  south-east of Lofthouse, located near Gouthwaite Reservoir. It is chiefly known for the Yorke Arms, formerly a Michelin-starred restaurant on the village green which takes its name from the lords of the manor, the Yorke family, who once lived in nearby Gouthwaite Hall. The Yorke Arms is now an event venue.

The Church of St Mary the Virgin was built in 1842, near to the remains of a Grade II listed medieval chapel which was originally part of a large grange built by the monks of Byland Abbey.

Ramsgill had a railway station on the Nidd Valley Light Railway, located in the hamlet of Bouthwaite. It opened in 1907 and closed in 1930.

The murderer Eugene Aram was born in Ramsgill.

References

External links 

Villages in North Yorkshire
Nidderdale